Leonardo Bianchi (born 28 January 1992) is an Italian footballer who plays as a midfielder for Scandicci.

Club career
Born in Sinalunga, Tuscany, Bianchi started his career at Tuscan club Empoli. From 2010 and 2012 Bianchi was the member of the reserve. Bianchi also received call-up to 2011 and 2012 pre-season camp of the first team; he wore no.17 shirt for 2011–12 Serie B, previously owned by Antonio Tognarelli. In late July 2012 Bianchi left for Pisa. However, after no league appearance, Bianchi was signed by Rimini in a temporary deal in January 2013.

On 8 August 2013, Bianchi, along with Gregorio Mazzanti and Claudio Santini, were signed by Gavorrano in a co-ownership deal. In June 2014 Empoli bought back Bianchi.

In summer 2014 he was signed by Lucchese.

On 20 December 2019 he moved to Serie D club Scandicci.

International career
Bianchi was a member of the Italy under-17 team at the 2009 UEFA European Under-17 Football Championship (where he played in 3 games), at the 2009 FIFA U-17 World Cup (playing in 2 games) and at the 2011 UEFA European Under-19 Football Championship qualification (appearing in all 3 games). Bianchi also received call-up to a training camp in the summer of 2007 for under-15 and under-14 player, however Bianchi was never promoted to the Italy under-16 team of 2007–08 season until he was recalled to the under-17 team in November 2008, after Italy had qualified from the first qualifying round.

References

External links
 AIC profile (data by football.it) 
 FIGC National Teams Archive 
 

1992 births
Living people
People from Sinalunga
Sportspeople from the Province of Siena
Italian footballers
Association football midfielders
Italy youth international footballers
Empoli F.C. players
Pisa S.C. players
Rimini F.C. 1912 players
U.S. Gavorrano players
S.S.D. Lucchese 1905 players
F.C. Rieti players
A.S.D. Jolly Montemurlo players
Scandicci Calcio players
Serie C players
Serie D players
Footballers from Tuscany